Robert Sheriff Black (1868 – 4 January 1939) was Mayor of Dunedin from 1929 to 1933.

Biography
Black was born in Liverpool in 1868 and migrated to Melbourne in Victoria, Australia. He came to New Zealand in 1897, where he entered the trade of exporting rabbit skins. In 1924, he married Helen Black, who was 30 years his junior. Black already had adult sons who were his wife's age, and together they had a further two sons and two daughters.

He first stood for the Dunedin mayoralty in 1919, but was beaten by William Begg. He won election in 1929 and served for two terms until the 1933 election, when he was beaten by Edwin Thomas Cox.

He died in Dunedin on 4 January 1939.

References

Mayors of Dunedin
1868 births
1938 deaths
New Zealand businesspeople
Unsuccessful candidates in the 1931 New Zealand general election